Churston Cove is a  cove with a sand and shingle beach on the outskirts of Brixham, surrounded by cliffs and wooded hillsides. An entrance to Churston Woods is located at the back of the cove. There is a steep path leading down to the beach which also passes through Churston Woods. It is on the South West Coast Path.

References

Beaches of Devon
Coves of Devon
Brixham